Doug the Pug (born May 20, 2012) is a pug dog living in Nashville, Tennessee, who has gained a large internet and social media following, and has reached the status of a "celebrity dog". 

Doug became famous on social media in 2014, when his owner Leslie Mosier created the Instagram account Doug the Pug. In 2016, the book "Doug the Pug: The King of Pop" was published, which was accompanied by an international promotion campaign.

Forbes named Doug the Pug the second most influential pet in 2018.

Doug won two People's Choice Awards for Animal Star in 2019 and 2020. 

In 2021 Doug the Pug subsequently provided all the voice work (including every bark and snore) for the role of Monchi, the Mitchells' pet pug, in the Sony Pictures-Netflix animated feature The Mitchells vs. the Machines.  

In 2022, a foundation was established in his name, that helps children fighting cancer and their families.[2]

He is the most followed pug on the internet with over 18 million collective followers. Doug's Facebook page has over 6 million likes and 10 billion Facebook video views; his Instagram account has 3.9 million followers, and his Twitter account has just hit over 2.6 million followers (as of 28 November 2021).

Career 
Doug has made appearances with various celebrities and also appears at music festivals, meet and greets, and movie premieres. Among these celebrities are Shakira, Ed Sheeran, Justin Bieber, Billie Eilish, John Legend, Cole Sprouse, Brendon Urie, PewDiePie and actors from the Netflix series Stranger Things. In 2016 He appeared in Katy Perry's music video for "Swish Swish",  in 2017 he appeared in Fall Out Boy's music video for "Irresistible", and in DNCE's lyric video for "Kissing Strangers".

Books
Doug's owner, Leslie Mosier, is The New York Times best-seller author of Doug the Pug: The King of Pop Culture, released in November 2016. Following the release of her book, Mosier took Doug on an international book tour with stops in England, Paris, and the United States.
To accompany her book, Mosier has released a line of calendars and a line of Doug the Pug apparel. Doug's first children's book was released with Scholastic in September 2019.

Media
The first national feature article on Doug was in Mashable. Since then, outlets such as Cosmopolitan, BuzzFeed, TIME and The Huffington Post have posted features of him.
 
Doug has appeared in national commercials for Truth, Febreze, Home Goods, Sabra, and Pedigree Petfoods. He has made his acting debut in The Mitchells vs. the Machines as the voice of Monchi the pug. The movie was nominated for an Academy Award.

Merchandise 
Doug has a line of merchandise at the retailer Claire's, with a range of Gund stuffed animals, backpacks, and apparel. Doug also has a line of greeting cards with American Greetings, sold at Target and Wal-Mart, a pair of shoes with Skechers,  and a line of dog toys with Outward Hound.

Awards and recognition 

 In 2019, the Mayor of Nashville, Tennessee declared May 20 "Doug the Pug Day" in the city.

Nashville Scene (2015) - Best of Nashville - "Best Instagram" Winner
Webby Awards (2016) - "Social Media Animal" Nominated
World Dog Awards (2016) - "Best Dressed" Winner
Shorty Awards (2016) - "Social Media Animal" Nominated
Shorty Awards (2017) - "Instagrammer of the Year" Winner
Nickelodeon Kids' Choice Awards (2018) - "Favorite Instagram Pet" Nominee 
People's Choice Awards (2019) - "The Animal Star of 2019" Winner
People's Choice Awards (2020) - "The Animal Star of 2020" Winner

References

External links

Doug the Pug's Instagram
Doug the Pug's Twitter

2012 animal births
Animals on the Internet
Dogs in popular culture
Individual dogs in the United States